is the name of a high-speed train service running on the Tokaido and San'yō Shinkansen "bullet train" lines in Japan. Slower than the premier Nozomi but faster than the all-stations Kodama, the Hikari is the fastest train service on the Tokaido and Sanyo Shinkansen that can be used with the Japan Rail Pass, which is not valid for travel on the Nozomi or Mizuho trains.

Service variations

West Hikari

These services first appeared in 1988 on the Sanyo Shinkansen between Shin-Osaka and Hakata using 6-car 0 series trains. 0 series 12-car SK units were employed on these services from 1989. From 11 March 2000, they were mostly replaced by the new 700 series Hikari Rail Star services, and were finally withdrawn on 21 April 2000.

Grand Hikari
These were the premier services operated between Tokyo and Hakata from 11 March 1989 using JR West 16-car 100 series V sets with four double-deck centre cars including a restaurant car. These operated at a maximum speed of 230 km/h on the Sanyo Shinkansen (compared to 220 km/h for other Hikari services). From 11 March 2000, restaurant car services were discontinued on all trains, and from May 2002 onwards, the few remaining Grand Hikari services were limited to the Sanyo Shinkansen only. The last Grand Hikari ran in November 2002.

Family Hikari
First appearing in the summer of 1995, these seasonal services operated between Shin-Osaka and Hakata during holiday periods using special 6-car 0 series sets (R2 and R24) which included a children's play area in car 3. All seats were reserved on these services.

Hikari Rail Star
JR West began operating the Hikari Rail Star service from the start of the new timetable on 11 March 2000. This service is limited to the Sanyo Shinkansen line, and uses special 8-car 700-7000 series trains with a distinctive livery and a maximum speed of 285 km/h. JR West introduced the service to provide better competition against airlines on the Osaka-Fukuoka route. These services do not have Green car accommodation, but the reserved seating cars feature 2+2 seating and also some 4-seat compartments instead of the standard 3+2 arrangement in non-reserved seating cars. The front row of seats in these cars feature power outlets for laptop users. With most Hikari Rail Star services being replaced by through Kyushu Shinkansen Sakura services from 12 March 2011, the 8-car 700 series sets used on the service have been running mostly on all-stations Kodama services on the Sanyo Shinkansen line. As of 14 March 2020, the Hikari Rail Star is the only special service variation to run on the Hikari service.

Rolling stock
 700 series 8-car E sets
 N700A series 16-car X/K sets, modified from N700 series Z/N sets
 N700 series 8-car S/R sets

Former rolling stock
 0 series
 100 series
 300 series
 500 series
 700 series 16-car B/C sets

Train formations

N700 series (16 cars)
16-car N700 series services are formed as follows with car 1 at the Hakata end and car 16 at the Tokyo end. All cars are non-smoking except for smoking compartments located in Cars 3, 7, 10, and 15.

N700 series (8 cars)
8-car N700 series services are formed as follows with car 1 at the Hakata end and car 8 at the Shin-Osaka end. All cars are non-smoking except for smoking compartments located in Cars 3 and 7.

700 series Hikari Rail Star
8-car 700 series Hikari Rail Star services are formed as follows with car 1 at the Hakata end and car 8 at the Shin-Osaka end. All cars are non-smoking.

History
Before and during World War II, Hikari was the name of an express train operated by Japan from Busan in Korea to Changchun in Manchuria.

The name Hikari was first introduced in Japan on 25 April 1958 for express services operating between Hakata and Beppu in Kyushu. This service operated until 30 September 1964, the day before the Tokaido Shinkansen opened.

When the Tokaido Shinkansen opened on 1 October 1964, the Hikari was the fastest train on the line, initially travelling from Tokyo Station to Shin-Osaka Station with only two stops (Nagoya and Kyoto). Hikari service was extended to the Sanyo Shinkansen later, although the Hikari trains were only slightly faster than the Kodama trains, earning them the derisive nickname "Hidama."

In March 2008, the new N700 Series Shinkansen was put into service on a morning Hikari service between Shin-Yokohama and Hiroshima stations, and a late night run between Tokyo and Nagoya. A third N700 Hikari run between Nagoya and Tokyo was added in October 2008, and a few other N700 Hikari runs have since been added.

From the start of the revised timetable on 17 March 2012, Hikari Rail Star services using 700 series 8-car E sets became entirely no-smoking.

As of 2012, JR Central Hikari services operating throughout the Tokaido/Sanyo corridor primarily use 16-car N700 series and 700 series sets. Most Hikari trains pull over at intermediate stations such as Shizuoka, Hamamatsu, Toyohashi, Maibara or Himeji to allow faster Nozomi services, to pass through without stopping.

See also
 List of named passenger trains of Japan

References

External links

Kawasaki Heavy Industries: Hikari Rail Star description

Railway services introduced in 1958
Central Japan Railway Company
West Japan Railway Company
Named Shinkansen trains